Gagnepainia is a genus of plants in the ginger family, Zingiberaceae. It has three known species, all native to Indochina. All three were initially described in 1895 as members of Hemiorchis, then transferred to the newly created Gagnepainia in 1904.

 Gagnepainia godefroyi (Baill.) K.Schum. in H.G.A.Engler  - Thailand, Myanmar, Cambodia
 Gagnepainia harmandii (Baill.) K.Schum. in H.G.A.Engler  - Cambodia
 Gagnepainia thoreliana (Baill.) K.Schum. in H.G.A.Engler - Vietnam

The genus was named in 1904 by Karl Moritz Schumann for French botanist François Gagnepain, who described many new species from the former colony of French Indochina.

References

External links
 Smithsonian National Museum of Natural History, Genera in the Zingiberaceae, Gagnepainia  

Zingiberoideae
Zingiberaceae genera
Taxa named by Karl Moritz Schumann
Taxa described in 1904